The West of Scotland Championships and later known as the Lang's West of Scotland Championships for sponsorship reasons was a combined men's and women's grass court tennis tournament first established in 1882. The last decade of the championships were held at Newlands Lawn Tennis Club, Glasgow, Lanarkshire, Scotland until 1983.

History
The West of Scotland Championships were established in 1882. The tournament ran under that name until 1969. In 1970 the tournament was renamed as the West of Scotland Open Tennis Championships. In 1972 the whisky company Hepburn & Ross who make the Red Hackle whisky brand took over sponsorship of the event and it was called the Red Hackle West of Scotland Championships till 1980. In 1981 the Glasgow based distilling firm Robertson & Baxter Group took over sponsorship of the event, and the tournaments was marketed as the Lang's  West of Scotland Championships until 1983.

Event name
 West of Scotland Championships (1882-1969)
 West of Scotland Open Tennis Championships (1970-1972)
 Red Hackle West of Scotland Championships (1973-1978)
 Lang's West of Scotland Championships (1981=1983)

See also
Tennis in Scotland

References

Grass court tennis tournaments
Defunct tennis tournaments in the United Kingdom